Huttons Ambo railway station was a minor railway station serving the twin villages of High Hutton and Low Hutton, and the village of Menethorpe, in North Yorkshire, England, on the York to Scarborough Line.

The villages were previously known as Hutton on the Hill and Hutton on Derwent. They were coupled together in 1589 (Yorkshire Fines, Tudor, m., p. 107).

The station was opened on 5 July 1845 by the York and North Midland Railway. It closed to regular passenger traffic in 1930.
The last station master was Mr Ken Collinson. The station was originally just named Hutton, but was renamed Huttons Ambo on 1 February 1885.

At one time, mathematician Karl Pearson's grandfather was stationmaster here, and John Cariss was porter.

In 1913, legislation was passed for a narrow gauge railway to Burythorpe, but this was never implemented.

References

External links
 Huttons Ambo station on navigable 1947 O. S. map

Disused railway stations in North Yorkshire
Railway stations in Great Britain opened in 1845
Railway stations in Great Britain closed in 1930
Former York and North Midland Railway stations
George Townsend Andrews railway stations